Pannonian language may refer to:

 Pannonian Romance language, a distinctive Romance language in Pannonia
 Pannonian Rusyn language, a linguistic variety of Rusyn language
 extinct language of ancient Pannonians from the pre-Roman era

See also
 Pannonia (disambiguation)
 Language (disambiguation)